Mandhoo or Mandhu (according to the Admiralty Charts) (Dhivehi: XXX) is one of the inhabited islands of Haddummati Atoll, administrative code Laamu.

Geography

Economy
This island is known for its tuna canning factory and for the STO government refrigerators.
A company called Horizon Fisheries Ltd. has built an entire city on the island, including all necessary facilities, in order to accommodate 1000 employees when the work is loaded. Although, on average, there are only 400 people living on the island.

References

Islands of the Maldives